Gautam Bhadra is a  historian of South Asia and was a member of the erstwhile Subaltern Studies collective. Bhadra was born in Kolkata in 1948. He obtained education at Presidency College, Jadavpur University and Jawaharlal Nehru University. He started teaching at the Department of History, University of Calcutta and continued there for more than 15 years. After that, he became the professor of history at Centre for Studies in Social Sciences, Calcutta (1996-2010). He was the second Tagore National Fellow at the National Library in Kolkata. Currently he is Honorary Professor at the Centre for Studies in Social Sciences (Jadunath Bhavan Museum and Resource Centre).

Awards and honours

In 2011, Bhadra was conferred with the prestigious Bengali literary award, Ananda Puraskar, for his book 'Nyara Bot-tolaye Jai Ko-bar?'

References

1948 births
Living people
Scholars from Kolkata
20th-century Indian historians
Bengali historians